was a town located in Kameda District, Oshima Subprefecture, Hokkaido, Japan.

As of 2004, the town had an estimated population of 10,826 and a density of 80.26 persons per km2. The total area was 134.88 km2.

On February 1, 2006, Ōno was merged with the town of Kamiiso (from Kamiiso District) to form the new city of Hokuto.

External links
Hokuto official website 

Dissolved municipalities of Hokkaido